Donald Ervin Baxter (born on June 2, 1943), also known as Donald E. Baxter is an Orthopedic surgeon based in Houston. He is known for his work in Baxter's Nerve Entrapment.

Early life and education 

Baxter was born in Atlanta, Georgia. He completed his BS from Mercer University in 1965. He attended the Medical College of Georgia and received his medical degree in 1969.

Career 
In 1970, After doing his internship at University of Texas Health Science Center, Baxter became Fellowship director and Clinical Professor of Orthopedic Surgeon at University of Texas Health Science Center and Baylor College of Medicine in Houston. He was also a Physician for Houston Ballet in 1990.

Baxter served as President of the American Orthopedic Foot & Ankle Society in 1991. In 1984, Baxter discovered a condition, "Baxter's Nerve Entrapment" where pain is felt when the first branch of the lateral plantar nerve becomes entrapped in the medial heel. Baxter has published around 26 peer-reviewed Articles.

Selected Publications 

 Baxter's the Foot and Ankle in Sport
 Foot & Ankle International (FAI)
 Common Forefoot Problems in Runners
 Nerve disorders in dancers

Awards

References

External links 

 Donald Baxter at Researchgate

1943 births
People from Houston
Mercer University alumni
Orthopedic surgeons

Medical College of Georgia alumni